Verny may refer to:
Verny, France, a commune in France
Verny, Russia, a list of localities in Russia

People with the surname
Léonce Verny (1837–1908), French engineer
Thomas Verny (1726–1808), French lawyer

See also
 Vernay (disambiguation)
 Verney (disambiguation)
 Verniy or Almaty,  a city in Kazakhstan, before 1921